Koonung may refer to:
 Koonung Creek, a small tributary of the Yarra River in the eastern suburbs of Melbourne, Victoria, Australia
 Koonung Province, an electorate of the Victorian Legislative Council, Victoria, Australia, 1992–2006
 Koonung Secondary College, a secondary state school in Mont Albert North, Victoria, Australia, in the eastern suburbs of Melbourne
 Koonung Creek Trail, a shared use path for cyclists and pedestrians, which follows Koonung Creek in the eastern suburbs of Melbourne, Victoria, Australia